Emilio Piazza Memorial School (EPMS) is a private, mixed day and boarding school located in Rumuigbo, Port Harcourt, Rivers State, Nigeria.

History
EPMS was founded by Paul Amrasa on 15 September 1996. It was established to honor the memory of Emilio Piazza, a Biella-born Italian businessman who sponsored Amrasa's accounting degree at the University of Bolton, England. After Amrasa returned from the United Kingdom, Piazza assisted him to get a job working for A. Micheletti & Sons, a sister company to Emilio Piazza Construction Company. In 1992, at age 56, Piazza died in Cameroon.

EPMS started with 6 classroom blocks, 7 teachers and 2 pupils. The population later increased to 18 pupils, and by 1997, an additional 27 had joined the school. Today, EPMS boasts around 600 pupils, 27 classroom blocks and 45 teachers, bringing the teacher to student ratio to 1:13.

See also
 List of schools in Port Harcourt

References

External links

Schools in Port Harcourt
Educational institutions established in 1996
Secondary schools in Rivers State
1996 establishments in Nigeria
1990s establishments in Rivers State
Obio-Akpor